The Great Slump was an economic depression that occurred in England from the 1430s to the 1480s.

History

The Great Slump occurred in England between approximately 1440 and 1480. The economic slowdown began in the 1430s in Northern England, spreading south in the 1440s, with the economy not recovering until the 1480s. The Great Slump took place against a wider trading crisis in Northern Europe, driven by shortages of silver, essential for the money supply, and a breakdown in trade. Some accounts refer to the event as a "credit crunch".

Some scholars blamed the slump on the effects of the Hundred Years' War and the economic blockades suffered by England due to its predations in France and its wars with Spain and the Hanseatic League. It was also said to be driven by multiple harvest failures in the 1430s and disease amongst livestock, that drove up the price of food and damaged the wider economy. Starting 1368 China's Ming Dynasty reversion to silver currency from the fiat currency of the Mongol Yuan Dynasty created substantial demand for the metal for the entirety of their reign.

The impact of the Great Slump was far-reaching across England. Certain groups were particularly badly affected: cloth exports fell by 35 per cent in just four years at the end of the 1440s, for example, collapsing by up to 90 per cent in some parts of the South-West. Prices of remaining trade goods fell dramatically as well. Popular rebellions ensued in 1450 under Jack Cade, and the events contributed to the outbreak of the Wars of the Roses in the 1460s.

One of the ways English merchants survived the Great Slump was through the formation of merchant networks, which enabled them to organize into large conglomerates. This allowed access to needed bullion and well-guarded credit.

See also
Great Bullion Famine
Economy of England in the Middle Ages
John and William Merfold
Hundred Years' War

References

Bibliography
 
 
 
 

1430s establishments in England
1480s disestablishments in England
Economy of medieval England
Recessions
15th century in England
15th-century economic history